Elections to Oadby and Wigston Borough Council took place on 2 May 2019, the same day as other United Kingdom local elections. All wards were up for election, each with 2 or 3 councillors to be elected. The Liberal Democrats retained overall control of the council.

Election results

Ward results

Oadby Brocks Hill

Oadby Grange

Oadby St Peter's

Oadby Uplands

Oadby Woodlands

South Wigston

Wigston All Saints

Wigston Fields

Wigston Meadowcourt

Wigston St Wolstan's

References 

Oadby
Oadby and Wigston Borough Council elections
2010s in Leicestershire